Kenya Highlands University (formerly Kenya Highlands Evangelical University)is fully-fledged (Chartered) private institution of higher learning. It is located in Kericho in Kenya.

History 
The ideological heritage of educational instruction at the Kenya Highlands Bible College, which became the University, dates back to 1932 when missionaries of World Gospel Mission saw the need for training their converts. This instruction not only needed to cover biblical and ministry-related subjects, but also teacher training. Teachers were prepared for the sixteen primary schools the mission had started. These first teachers also served as preachers in their communities. A school first started in 1936 in the Sotik area as a Teacher's Bible School and met in various locations.

In 1944, the school was officially opened as Sotik Bible School and courses continued to combine training techniques in primary school teaching and Bible. The following year, the Bible School students were separated from the teacher training group as the need for trained leadership for the church grew. In 1950 the school was relocated from Sotik to Cheptenye in Belgut area.

Due to the need for more space to develop classrooms, dormitories, library and chapel facilities and staff housing, another plot was sought which would be separate from the established mission stations. The present site was acquired in 1953, and in 1955 Kenya Highlands Bible School was begun, offering a two-year Bible programme leading to the Christian Workers Certificate. In 1957 the course was upgraded to include a three-year programme leading to a diploma in Bible.

In 1962, the level of admission and training was again elevated to provide training on a secondary level in both biblical and secular subjects, and the name was changed to Kenya Highlands Bible College. In 1967 the college started offering secondary school education up to 1973 when it ceased offering “O” level. In 1970 the Bible College Council was constituted, drawing its membership equally from the church and the mission, and charged with the responsibility of managing the institution and improving the academic standards. In 1971 the college admitted its first class of post-secondary students into a four-year curriculum, modeled after degree-granting Bible colleges in North America, leading to the degree of Bachelor of Religion in Biblical Studies.

Accreditation
In 1989 the college was registered by the Commission for Higher Education to operate as a private College and is now a candidate for accreditation. The College Council and the Administration have been meeting regularly with the Commission to bring facilities and academic programmes up to recognized College standards.

Throughout their history, the Africa Gospel Church and World Gospel Mission have sought to respond to the needs of the church and community by developing and upgrading their educational training programmes. The current phase of upgrading to Kenya Highlands Evangelical College is a product of this development as the college continues to strive to be faithful to scriptural truth and relevant to its culture by its educational objective of equipping students for ministry through academic excellence and practical experience.

Academics

Masters Programs 

 Masters in Business Administration.
 MA – in Philosophy and Religion.
Master of arts in Counseling Psychology

Undergraduate programs 

 Bachelor of Library and Information Science (BLIS)
 Bachelor of Education (Arts)
 Bachelor of Arts Counseling Psychology
 Bachelor of Science Computer Science
 Bachelor of Science in Information Technology
 Bachelor of Business Management
 Bachelor of Education (Early Childhood)
 Bachelor of Christian Education
 Bachelor of Theology
 Bachelor of Business Information Technology
 Bachelor of Public Administration and Policy Development.
 Bachelor of Science (Records Management and Information Technology)
 Bachelor of Arts in Procurement and Supply Chain Management

Diploma Programs 

 Diploma in Business Management
 Diploma in Computer Science
 Diploma in Information Technology
 Diploma in Library Science
 Diploma in Education (Primary option)
 Diploma in Education (Arts)
 Diploma in Theology
 Diploma in Counseling Psychology
 Diploma in Procurement Management
 Diploma in Records Management
 Diploma in Journalism/Media Communication
 Diploma in Criminology
 Diploma in Cohesion, Peace and Reconciliation
 Diploma in Public Administration and Policy Development
 Diploma in Hospitality Tourism Management
 Diploma in Human Resource Management
 Diploma in Sales and Marketing Management
 Diploma in Project Planning and Management
 Diploma in Veterinary Science
 Diploma in Entrepreneurship and Information Technology

Certificate Programs 

 Certificate in Information Technology
 Certificate in Library Studies
 Certificate Theology and Sustainable Community Health and Development
 Certificate in Business Management
 Certificate in Criminology.
 ICT Professional Certification Programs (CCNA, CCNP, MCSE, ICDL, CCNA security and many more)
 KATC I & II Intermediate and Final Level
 CPA Parts I, II, III

References

External links

World Gospel Mission
Africa Gospel Church
Official Facebook Account

Universities and colleges in Kenya
Educational institutions established in 1970
1970 establishments in Kenya